The New Zealand DA class locomotive were a class of diesel-electric mainline locomotives operated on the New Zealand railway system between 1955 and 1989. Consisting of 146 locomotives, it was the most numerous class to ever operate in New Zealand, with five more than the AB class steam locomotive.

The class were A1A-A1A versions of the Electro-Motive Diesel G12 model, with the design altered slightly to run on New Zealand's  rail system, and fit the small loading gauge. They were introduced between 1955 and 1967 in three phases and were the first class of diesel locomotives to seriously displace steam traction.

Between 1978 and 1983, 85 locomotives were rebuilt as the DC class, of which some are still in use. All but one of the remainder were withdrawn by 1989, with six preserved. The last locomotive was refitted for shunting duties and was rebuilt as DAR 517.

Introduction
The DA class have their origins in the post World War II period. Like most nations New Zealand's dominant form of railway traction was steam, with electrification being used in Wellington, the Christchurch - Lyttleton Line and through the Otira Tunnel. The General Manager of the New Zealand Railways (NZR), Frank Aickin, was an advocate for electrifying the entire North Island Main Trunk (NIMT) to alleviate the shortage of coal and the cost of importing diesel fuel; though he also recognised that steam and diesel traction would be required on other lines.

Aickin went as far as negotiating a supply contract in 1946, but fell out with the government in 1951 and retired. His successor, H.C. Lusty, terminated the contract. After a disappointing experience with the DF class locomotives and facing significant capacity issues on the NIMT, NZR entered into an agreement with General Motors for the supply of 30 G12 model locomotives following a tender process. Designated by NZR as the DA class one of the major appeals was the guarantee of delivery within five months. They were the first locomotives supplied from the United States of America since the NZR Aa class of 1914. With two production lines at London, Ontario and La Grange, Illinois two locomotives were completed every three days. At the time, they were the highest and widest locomotives ever used in New Zealand.

Phase I 

This first batch of 30 were built by General Motors Diesel, Montreal. known as Phase I, (DA 1400-1429) entered service between August 1955 and January 1956. A second batch (DA 1430-1439) were built by Clyde Engineering in Sydney and entered service during 1957. The Australian-built locomotives differed from the Canadian ones in having a shunter's refuge at the No. 2 end.

Phase II 
Three further batches were ordered, all supplied by General Motors Diesel, Montreal. The first 12 units (DA 1440-1451) were dubbed as Phase II and entered service in 1961.

Phase III 
The 94 Phase III units entering service from 1962 to 1964 (40) and 1966–67 (54), taking the total number in the DA class to 146. This final order saw the final end of steam traction in the North Island. At the same time the final DA was made, an order for smaller and lighter DB class locomotives was also placed with EMD.

In service
The class operated in the North Island. To facilitate their fast delivery a greater loading gauge was accepted meaning that initially they could only operate on the NIMT from Auckland to Paekakariki, and the Rotorua, Kinleith and Tokoroa branches. They were excluded from operating on many branch lines on account of their weight, and were restricted in their operations on the East Coast Main Trunk (ECMT) beyond Paeroa due to the lightly-laid line through the Karangahake and Athenree gorges. Instead the lighter DF and DB class locomotives handled traffic on this line. These restrictions were reduced as bridges were progressively strengthened, and in the case of the ECMT with the opening of the Kaimai Tunnel in 1978.

The first (1955) locomotives had fabricated bogies welded from steel pressings and because of the roll on curves were restricted to goods service. Later batches (from DA 1440) had Dofasco cast steel bogies with an improved spring layout and were suitable for express working.

The class were also unable initially to reach Wellington via the NIMT, as the tunnels south of Paekakariki built in the 1880s by the Wellington and Manawatu Railway Company did not have enough clearance under the 1500V DC Wellington suburban electrification overhead wires. The operational practice remained the same as it had in the steam age, with an exchange with ED and EW class electric locomotives taking place at Paekakariki. The tunnel floors were lowered south of Paekakariki in 1967 and the DA class could then operate all the way through to Wellington. Access to Wellington before this time for the DA class could only be achieved via the Wairarapa line and the Rimutaka Tunnel.

The DA class were employed on all the major lines in the North Island: the NIMT, Marton-New Plymouth, Palmerston North-Gisborne and North Auckland lines. The success of the DA class in its reliability and performance meant that it was the major factor allowing the withdrawal of North Island steam locomotives by 1967. The class were successful in raising the freight capacity of the NIMT. The main limitation was the Raurimu Spiral, where a pair of DA class locomotives could haul 650 tonnes up the grade compared to 595 tonnes for their KA class steam predecessors.

The class hauled all manner of freight and passenger services, including the Scenic Daylight service on the NIMT. The prestigious Silver Star overnight sleeper train was initially hauled by a pair of DA class locomotives when it was introduced in 1971. A dedicated pool of locomotives - DAs 1520-1527 and later joined by 1528 - were used for this service.

The need for a more powerful locomotive that could haul longer and heavier trains on the NIMT had been identified, and in 1972 the first 15 DX class locomotives were introduced. While a single DX produced 70 kW less than a pair of DA class locomotives, it weighed 97.5 tonnes compared to the combined weight of two DA class at 162 tonnes, which combined with more powered axles gave better traction and higher power to weight ratio.

The Silver Star service was later transferred to the DX class, while the Scenic Daylight service had earlier been replaced by the Blue Streak railcars. The introduction of further DX class locomotives in 1975-76 ended the dominance of the DA class on the NIMT. Units were also employed on the Auckland suburban network, hauling 56-foot carriages.

The 40 locomotives that were not converted to the DC class continued in service throughout most of the 1980s. The combination of the deregulation of land transport and the decline in rail freight volumes, reduced inter-regional passenger numbers, and the electrification of the NIMT saw them become surplus to requirements. Due to tunnel clearance problems on North Auckland Line through the Makarau Tunnel which prevented DC locomotives working in Northland, twelve DA class locomotives were given an "A grade" overhaul in 1980 with some modifications to improve crew comfort. They were painted in International Orange colours at the same time.

Numbering
The DA class established the initial numbering practice for NZR diesel locomotives, numbering the units sequentially with the class leader numbered in reference to the locomotives horsepower. While the locomotives were actually rated at 1425 hp, numbering started at 1400 and continued up to 1545.

In 1979 the computerised Traffic Monitoring System (TMS) was introduced, with the remaining members of the class renumbered in sequence and the classification capitalised. Because this took place during the DC rebuild programme some units received a new DA series number before being withdrawn for conversion, upon which they received a new DC class number. Under the numbering DA 1400 became DA11 and DA 1516 became DA996, prior to it being rebuilt into DC4830.

Livery
From their introduction, the class were painted in an overall deep red colour described as New Zealand Government Railways red. White or silver stripes were added along much of the length of the body, culminating in wings on each end.

The locomotives redesignated as DAA received gold stripes to differentiate them from other DA and DB class locomotives. Following the introduction of TMS many had their new road numbers applied to the long hood.

During the 1980s some locomotives were repainted in the International Orange livery (red sides, grey upper and lower surfaces and yellow safety ends) then being applied to other NZR locomotives, with the road number applied in large white type on the long hood. Many units were retired still wearing the original NZR red.

Conversions and rebuilds

DAA class 

In 1970, locomotives DA 1400-04 and 1406 were withdrawn from mainline duties and reassigned as heavy shunters to work in the new Te Rapa hump yard. They received additional low speed controls to assist in these operations, special in-cab Signals to indicate "faster", "slower", "maintain power" and "stop" for drivers linked back to the grid control tower by VHF radio, and a separate VHF radio channel for voice communication to the control tower.

The locomotives were reclassified as the DAA class. These locomotives were identifiable by their yellow hood stripes, which were treated so to denote them as being used in special service apart from the DA class. The locomotives were later superseded by the DSG and DSJ class shunting locomotives, which were purpose-built for shunting as opposed to the DAA class being converted for that purpose, and were withdrawn progressively in the 1980s.

Two DAA class locomotives have been preserved. On its withdrawal in 1983, DAA 1400 (TMS DA11) was cosmetically restored as DA 1400 and donated to the Museum of Transport & Technology (MOTAT) in Auckland. Placed on static display at MOTAT's Great North Road site, it was moved in late 2014 to MOTAT's Meola Road site to make way for an upgraded pavilion surrounding steam locomotive K 900. It is significant as the first of the DA class to have been built.

The other, DAA 1401 (TMS DA 28) was withdrawn in 1986 and forwarded to Sims Metal-PMI scrapyard at Otahuhu. In 1988, the locomotive was purchased by enthusiast Tony Bachelor, who moved it around various homes in the Auckland area as part of his Pacific Rail Trust. In 1999 it was leased to Tranz Rail, but received little use and was stored at Hutt Workshops. In 2005, the locomotive was re-activated, and in 2007 was loaned to Feilding and District Steam Rail Society at the conclusion of the lease agreement with Tranz Rail and Toll Rail. DA 1401 was gifted to the Feilding and District Steam Rail Society in 2008, who are now planning for its eventual restoration.

DC class 

In 1977 NZR decided to rebuild 30 of the later Phase III GM Canada-built DA class locomotives into the EMD G22AR model to become the DC class. Over seven years, 80 were rebuilt by Clyde Engineering in Adelaide, while a further five were rebuilt at Hutt Workshops using a mixture of components built at Hutt and Clyde. The first few were shipped directly to Port Adelaide, but after the Union Company withdrew its roll-on/roll-off services, most were shipped to Melbourne's Appleton Dock and hauled to Adelaide via the  Victorian and South Australian lines.

Only one of the final batch of 54 Phase III DA class locomotives was not rebuilt - DA 1517 had been scrapped in 1974 due to damage sustained when it ran into a landslip at the entrance to the Fordell tunnel in 1973. Two locomotives - DAs 1533 and 1470 were both rebuilt from heavily damaged conditions sustained in accidents running light engine. 1533 was damaged in an accident while returning from National Park on banking duty in 1975; due to a rivalry between locomotive drivers at Taumarunui depot, the locomotive entered a curve too fast and overturned, killing the locomotive engineer. 1470 derailed on the steep Pukerua Bay section in 1978 returning to Wellington due to speeding on a curve, and nearly ended up on State Highway 1 below the line; both of the crew were killed.

Ten of the Phase III locomotives were not rebuilt. Two of the Phase II locomotives - DAs 1441 and 1446 - were amongst those rebuilt.

Many of the DC class remain in service today with ownership held by KiwiRail. Several were leased to Auckland Transport. One, DC4588, was exported to Tasmania in 1999, but found to be unsuccessful and was withdrawn in October 2002 with serious motor problems. After a long period of inactivity, the locomotive, which had been partway through a rebuild to make it more suitable for Tasmanian conditions, was sold for scrap by TasRail in mid-2011.

DAR class

In 1989, Tasman Pulp & Paper was looking to replace their resident Kawerau shunting locomotive, Bagnall 0-6-0DM NO 3079. This locomotive had been rebuilt in the late 1970s with a new Caterpillar D343T diesel engine and torque converter to make it more effective as a heavy shunter, but due to increases in traffic, was no longer able to keep up.

NZR initially offered a DH class locomotive as a replacement. Tasman did not feel the locomotive would be up to the task. At the time, NZR was withdrawing the last DA class locomotives, and the decision was made to offer DA512 as a new heavy shunter.

The locomotive was altered by chopping the front hood containing the dynamic brake components and altering the cab for better forward visibility. It was painted in Tasman's orange-brown colours before it entered service at Kawerau. This allowed the Bagnall to be withdrawn, and later scrapped after being offered to the Bay of Islands Vintage Railway.

In 1998, Tasman decided to sell its locomotive back to Tranz Rail, who would then take over the duties of shunting the Kawerau yard with more conventional shunting locomotives. DA512 was sold to Tranz Rail who immediately moved it to Hutt Workshops for further alterations to make it more suitable as a heavy shunting locomotive. This included fitting shunter's refuges at either end of the locomotive and extended drawgear to accommodate the extra length of the refuges, as well as a repaint in the then-current "Cato Blue" livery.

Renumbered as DAR517, the locomotive was released from Hutt in 1999 and allocated to the Kiwi Dairies milk factory at Whareroa, near Hāwera. Here, it replaced ex-NZR Bagnall DSA414 (DSA 240, the sub-class leader) as the resident shunting locomotive. It was repainted in the Toll Rail "Corn Cob" colours in 2005, but was withdrawn from service in September 2008 for an overhaul and was placed in storage at Hutt Workshops. The locomotive was scrapped in December 2017.

Withdrawal
With the lack of ongoing operational requirements and the age of the units that were not rebuilt themselves the number of units was reduced throughout the 1980s. Most of the first batch delivered were withdrawn by the end of 1986. By 19 December 1987 18 DA class locomotives were still in service, with the majority (12) being in service for use on the North Auckland Line.

In March 1988 the Railways Corporation began progressively introducing single-manning of trains. The DA class, along with the DJ class, were deemed to be not suitable for single-manning due to their cab configuration. By April 1989 only one DA class locomotive, DA512, remained.

Following their withdrawal, most units were taken to Hutt for scrapping during the early 1990s, though a few were scrapped elsewhere.

Preservation

Six DA class locomotives have been preserved:
DA 1400/DAA 1400: (TMS DA 11) was donated to the Museum of Transport & Technology in Auckland in 1983 as the class leader of the DA class. Statically restored for static display. It was moved from its display location at MOTAT 1 in Great North Road, to the museums Meola Road site and undercover for conservation on 26 September 2014.
DA 1401/DAA 1401: (TMS DA 28) was sold to Sims-PMI for scrap in 1986 but remained intact until purchased by Tony Bachelor in 1988 for his Pacific Rail Trust. Moved around Auckland, it was leased by the now-inactive PRT to Tranz Rail in 1997 although it only saw limited service and was quickly stored at Hutt Workshops. It was reactivated for Feilding and District Steam Rail Society by Toll Rail in 2005 and went on lease to them in 2007 before being donated by Bachelor to F&DSR in 2008.
DA 1410: (TMS DA 126) was purchased from NZ Rail in 1988 by Steam Incorporated. Initially only requiring a repaint, it was overhauled in 1999 shortly before being sent on loan to the Railway Enthusiasts Society, who based it at the Glenbrook Vintage Railway. 1410 was on loan to the Glenbrook Vintage Railway, 1998. Returned to Steam Incorporated over the weekend of 6–7 June 2015 along with J 1234. 1410 is now registered to operate heritage passenger trains on the National Rail System.
DA 1429: (TMS DA 322) was purchased in 1987 by Tony Bachelor direct from NZR service. It moved around Auckland until leased to Tranz Rail in 1997 and saw regular service until 2003 when it ended up in Otahuhu. In 2010, Bachelor sold the locomotive to Auckland enthusiast Dean McQuoid who had it moved to the Glenbrook Vintage Railway where it is now based and used occasionally. Its registration to operate on the National rail system has lapsed and the now requires major rebuild.
DA 1431: (TMS DA 345) was purchased from NZR in 1989 by Steam Incorporated. It was also placed on loan to the Railway Enthusiasts Society in 1998. Stored at the Glenbrook Vintage Railway until 2008, it returned to Paekakariki in 2008 for restoration with RES-owned guards' van F 345. The restored locomotive returned to service in 2009.
DA 1471: (TMS DA 725) was retained by Palmerston North depot staff in 1988 as a heritage unit. In 2002 it was leased to Steam Incorporated but was called back from its restoration base at Masterton by Toll Rail in 2007. Stored at Hutt Workshops, the locomotive deteriorated until purchased by Steam Inc. for preservation in 2012. It is currently under restoration.

Only two of the locomotives, 1410 and 1431 are currently National Rail Network registered although there are plans for 1471 and 1401 to join the ranks in due course.

Models
Brazilian model railways manufacturer Frateschi produces a DA class look-alike in HO scale.

References

Footnotes

Citations

Bibliography

 
 
 
 

 

A1A-A1A locomotives
Clyde Engineering locomotives
DA class
Electro-Motive Division locomotives
General Motors Diesel locomotives
Railway locomotives introduced in 1955
3 ft 6 in gauge locomotives of New Zealand